The Computer Wore Tennis Shoes is a 1969 American science fiction comedy film starring Kurt Russell, Cesar Romero, Joe Flynn and William Schallert. It was produced by Walt Disney Productions and distributed by Buena Vista Distribution Company.

It was one of several films made by Disney using the setting of Medfield College, first used in the 1961 Disney film The Absent-Minded Professor and its sequel Son of Flubber. Both sequels to The Computer Wore Tennis Shoes, Now You See Him, Now You Don't and The Strongest Man in the World, were also set at Medfield.

Plot 
Dexter Reilly (Kurt Russell) and his friends attend a small, private college known as Medfield College, which cannot afford to buy a computer. The students persuade wealthy businessman A. J. Arno (Cesar Romero) to donate an old computer to the college. Arno is secretly the head of a large illegal gambling ring which used the computer for its operations.

While installing a replacement computer part during a thunderstorm, Reilly receives an electric shock and becomes a human computer. He now has superhuman mathematical talent, can read and remember the contents of an encyclopedia volume in a few minutes, and can speak a language fluently after reading one textbook. His new abilities make him a worldwide celebrity and Medfield's best chance to win a televised quiz tournament with a $100,000 prize.

Reilly single-handedly leads Medfield's team in victories against other colleges. During the tournament, on live television, a trigger word ("applejack") causes him to unknowingly recite details of Arno's gambling ring. Arno's henchmen kidnap Reilly and plan to kill him, but his friends help him escape by locating the house in which he is being kept, posing as house painters to gain access, and sneaking him out in a large trunk. During the escape, he suffers a concussion which, during the tournament final against rival Springfield State, gradually returns his mental abilities to normal; however, one of his friends, Schuyler, is able to answer the final question ("A small Midwest city is located exactly on an area designated as the geographic center of the United States. For 10 points and $100,000, can you tell us the name of that city?" with the answer "Lebanon, Kansas"). Medfield wins the $100,000 prize. Arno and his henchmen are arrested when they attempt to escape the TV studio and crash head-on into a police car.

Cast

 Kurt Russell as Dexter Reilly
 Cesar Romero as A. J. Arno
 Joe Flynn as Dean Higgins
 William Schallert as Professor Quigley
 Alan Hewitt as Dean Collingsgood
 Richard Bakalyan as Chillie Walsh
 Debbie Paine as Annie Hannah
 Frank Webb as Pete
 Michael McGreevey as Schuyler
 Jon Provost as Bradley
 Frank Welker as Henry
 W. Alex Clarke as Myles
 Bing Russell as Angelo
 Pat Harrington as Moderator
 Fabian Dean as Little Mac
 Fritz Feld as Sigmund van Dyke
 Pete Ronoudet as Lt. Charles "Charlie" Hannah
 Hillyard Anderson as J. Reedy
 David Canary* as Walski
 Robert Foul* as Police desk sergeant
 Ed Begley Jr.* as a Springfield State panelist

* Not credited on-screen.

Reception
A. H. Weiler of The New York Times wrote: "This 'Computer' isn't I.B.M.'s kind but it's homey, lovable, as exciting as porridge and as antiseptic and predictable as any homey, half-hour TV family show". Gene Siskel of the Chicago Tribune reported: "I rather enjoyed The Computer Wore Tennis Shoes and I suspect children under 14 will like it, too". Arthur D. Murphy of Variety praised the film as "above-average family entertainment, enhanced in great measure by zesty, but never show-off, direction by Robert Butler, in a debut swing to pix from telefilm". Kevin Thomas of the Los Angeles Times wrote that "Disney Productions latched on to a terrific premise for some sharp satire only to flatten it out by jamming it into its familiar 'wholesome' formula. Alas, the movie itself comes out looking like it had been made by a computer".

The film holds a score of 50% on Rotten Tomatoes based on six reviews.

Legacy

Sequels
 Now You See Him, Now You Don't (1972)
 The Strongest Man in the World (1975)

Television films
This film was remade as the television film The Computer Wore Tennis Shoes in 1995 starring Kirk Cameron as Dexter Riley.

Other Disney Channel films carrying similar plot elements were the Not Quite Human film series, which aired in the late 1980s and early 1990s. The films were based on the series of novels with the same name.

Other
The animated title sequence, by future Academy Award-winning British visual effects artist Alan Maley, reproduced the look of contemporary computer graphics using stop motion photography of paper cutouts. It has been cited as an early example of "computational kitsch".

The 2000 episode of The Simpsons, "The Computer Wore Menace Shoes", is a reference to the film but the episode isn't related to the film in any other way, according to M. Keith Booker in his book Drawn to Television: Prime-Time Animation from The Flintstones to Family Guy.

See also
 Dexter Riley (film series)
 List of American films of 1969

References
Footnotes

Bibliography

External links 
  (archived)
 
 
 

1969 films
1960s science fiction comedy films
American science fiction comedy films
Walt Disney Pictures films
Films about computing
Films directed by Robert Butler
Medfield College films
Films set in universities and colleges
1969 comedy films
1960s English-language films
1960s American films